William Osmond Green (11 March 1906 – 26 May 1991) was an Australian rules footballer who played with Melbourne in the Victorian Football League (VFL).

Notes

External links 

1906 births
1991 deaths
Australian rules footballers from Melbourne
Melbourne Football Club players
Brunswick Football Club players
People from Hawthorn, Victoria